Rizzieri Rodeghiero (December 5, 1919 – January 12, 1996) was an Italian cross-country and Nordic combined skier who competed in the 1948 Winter Olympics.

He is the younger brother of Christiano Rodeghiero.

In 1948 he was a member of the Italian relay team which finished sixth in the 4x10 km relay competition. He also participated in the 18 km event where he finished 31st. In the Nordic combined event he finished 15th.

Further notable results

Cross-country skiing 
 1946: 2nd, Italian men's championships of cross-country skiing, 50 km
 1947:
 1st, Italian men's championships of cross-country skiing, 46 km
 2nd, Italian men's championships of cross-country skiing, 18 km
 1948:
 1st, Italian men's championships of cross-country skiing, 18 km
 2nd, Italian men's championships of cross-country skiing, 50 km
 1951: 1st, Italian men's championships of cross-country skiing, 18 km

Nordic combined 
 1946: 1st, Italian championships of Nordic combined skiing
 1947: 1st, Italian championships of Nordic combined skiing
 1948: 1st, Italian championships of Nordic combined skiing
 1951: 1st, Italian championships of Nordic combined skiing
 1952: 2nd, Italian championships of Nordic combined skiing

External links
profile

1919 births
1996 deaths
Italian male Nordic combined skiers
Italian male cross-country skiers
Olympic Nordic combined skiers of Italy
Olympic cross-country skiers of Italy
Nordic combined skiers at the 1948 Winter Olympics
Cross-country skiers at the 1948 Winter Olympics